Maurice Bernard Smith (born June 14, 1995) is an American football safety for the Vegas Vipers of the XFL. He played college football at Alabama and Georgia.

High school career
Smith attended John Foster Dulles High School in Sugar Land, Texas. He would play on the school's football team. He was a consensus four-star cornerback, he played in the Under Armour All-American Game, and was ranked as the No. 5 cornerback in the class of 2013. Smith committed to Alabama over offers from Arkansas, Florida, LSU, Nebraska, Ohio State, Texas, Texas A&M, and Utah, among others.

College career
Smith played for Alabama from 2013 to 2015 and transferred to Georgia in 2016 as a graduate transfer. In his only season as a Bulldog, he was named team captain. He finished the season with 50 total tackles, three passes defended, two interceptions and two forced fumbles.

Professional career

Miami Dolphins
Smith signed with the Miami Dolphins as an undrafted free agent on May 5, 2017. He was placed on the reserve/non-football illness list on December 2, 2017.

On September 3, 2018, Smith was waived by the Dolphins and was re-signed to the practice squad. He was promoted to the active roster on September 18, 2018. He was waived again on October 29, 2018, and re-signed to the practice squad. He was promoted back to the active roster on December 21, 2018.

On August 31, 2019, Smith was waived by the Dolphins.

Washington Redskins
On October 14, 2019, Smith was signed to the Washington Redskins practice squad. He was promoted to the active roster on December 18, 2019. He was waived on August 3, 2020.

Cincinnati Bengals
Smith had a tryout with the Cincinnati Bengals on August 23, 2020. He signed with the team three days later. He was waived on September 5, 2020.

Tennessee Titans
Smith was signed to the Tennessee Titans practice squad on September 17, 2020, but was released four days later. On September 29, 2020, Smith was re-signed to the practice squad. He was released on October 20, 2020. On February 1, 2021, Smith signed a reserve/futures contract with the Titans. On August 16, 2021, Smith was waived/injured by the Titans and placed on injured reserve. He was released on August 25.

Vegas Vipers
Smith was a draft selection by the Vegas Vipers in the 2023 XFL Draft. He was placed on the reserve list by the team on February 16, 2023. He was activated on March 15.

References

External links
Georgia Bulldogs bio

1995 births
Living people
Alabama Crimson Tide football players
Cincinnati Bengals players
Georgia Bulldogs football players
Miami Dolphins players
People from Sugar Land, Texas
Players of American football from Texas
Sportspeople from the Houston metropolitan area
Tennessee Titans players
Washington Redskins players
Washington Football Team players
Vegas Vipers players